Antoine Shousha (4 March 1927 – 18 December 2002) was an Egyptian sports shooter. He competed in three events at the 1952 Summer Olympics.

References

1927 births
2002 deaths
Egyptian male sport shooters
Olympic shooters of Egypt
Shooters at the 1952 Summer Olympics
Place of birth missing